The 1946–47 season was the 46th year of competitive football played by Southampton F.C., the club's 20th season as members of the Football League, and their 18th competing in the Second Division. The Saints finished the campaign in 14th place in the league table, having gained 39 from a possible 84 points with 15 wins, 9 draws and 18 losses. The club also competed in the FA Cup, making it to the fourth round after just one win, against fellow Second Division side Bury.

Following a break due to the Second World War, league football resumed in England in 1946. The 1946–47 season was the club's first to feature Bill Dodgin as manager, who joined and played for the club during wartime, and was appointed manager in March 1946. In the summer before the start of the season, the Saints made a number of new signings, including bringing in full-back Bill Rochford from local rivals Portsmouth, who had just won the FA Cup, as well as centre-forward George Lewis for a "four-figure fee". Partway through the season, they signed wing-half Joe Mallett from Queens Park Rangers for a club record fee of £5,000. Due to the lack of official competition during wartime, many players made their official debuts for the club during the season, including eight in the first match.

During the season, 24 players appeared for Southampton in all competitions. New signing Bill Rochford featured in more games than any other player, appearing in 43 of the club's 44 games during the season (he missed just one league game, against Luton Town on 22 February 1947). Jack Bradley, who had joined the club during the abandoned 1939–40 season, finished as Southampton's top league scorer with 14 goals; Bradley and new signing George Lewis each scored 15 goals in all competitions. The club attracted an average home league attendance at The Dell of 16,039 – the highest attendance was 25,746 against Newcastle United.

Pre-season friendlies
In preparation for the 1946–47 season, Southampton played two pre-season friendly matches. On 14 August 1946 the Saints won 4–1 against Irish club Bohemians, with new signing George Lewis and Don Roper scoring two goals each. They then beat French side Le Havre 7–0 at home thanks to a hat-trick from Don Roper, two goals from Doug McGibbon, and one each from Jack Bradley and Bobby Veck.

Second Division

Season summary
After their initial opening game of the season against Newport County was postponed due to unseasonable flooding, Southampton began the 1946–47 season well with a 4–0 win over Swansea Town at home, with Doug McGibbon scoring a hat-trick. The team dropped down to 10th in the table with a draw and a loss, before beating Nottingham Forest convincingly 5–2 thanks to goals from McGibbon (two), Alf Freeman (two) and Jack Bradley. The Saints began to drop down the league table in October thanks to a winless run, but picked their form back up at the end of the month with wins over Newport County and Plymouth Argyle. The club's fortunes continued to change week on week, although they finished the year off strongly with a 5–1 win over Newport County to remain in the top ten going into 1947.

The new year began poorly for the Saints with three consecutive losses away from home in which the side conceded 11 goals, prompting Dodgin to replace regular goalkeeper George Ephgrave with Len Stansbridge for much of the rest of the season. Through February and March, the team won four out of seven matches (including a 5–2 home victory over Coventry City and three away wins) to move away from the relegation zone and back up to the top ten, although four straight losses against high-performing opponents saw them drop back down to 15th in April. Seven players were released by the club near the end of the month. Three wins from their last six matches meant that Southampton finished 14th in the Second Division table, improving on their 18th-place finish in the last pre-war season eight years earlier.

Final league table

Results by matchday

Match results

FA Cup
Bury (11 January 1947)
Southampton entered the 1946–47 FA Cup in the third round, facing fellow Second Division side Bury at home on 11 January 1947. The Saints controlled the game from the early exchanges, with Jack Bradley, George Lewis and Billy Bevis scoring within the first 16 minutes to put the hosts 3–0 up. Bury pulled one back before the break through a penalty, which was awarded due to a handball in the area by George Smith, and dominated the share of possession going into half-time. In the second half, the Saints quickly reasserted their dominance and made it 4–1 through a second goal from Lewis in the 52nd minute. After he was initially denied by the crossbar earlier on, Lewis did later complete his hat-trick (the club's first in the competition proper) when he converted following a run by Eric Webber.

Newcastle United (25 January 1947)
In the fourth round Southampton travelled to face Newcastle United, who were then second in the Second Division league table. The Saints took the lead in the 11th minute, as Don Roper shot from the outside of the box and scored due to a deflection off centre-half Frank Brennan. The lead remained until the break, however the hosts' pressure going into the break continued in the second half when Charlie Wayman equalised shortly after half-time. Nine minutes later he scored again, heading in a Doug Wright free-kick. Despite increased attacking pressure from the Saints, Wayman completed his hat-trick later in the game to put Newcastle through to the fifth round. The Magpies went on to make it to the semi-finals of the tournament, before being knocked out by eventual champions Charlton Athletic.

Post-season friendlies
Around the end of the season, Southampton played three more friendlies – two before the league had concluded, the third shortly after. The first saw the Saints travel to face Guernsey's international side on 14 May 1947, who they beat 2–1 thanks to goals from Jack Bradley and George Lewis. A week later, the Saints hosted Bournemouth & Boscombe Athletic for the Hampshire Professional Cup, a local exhibition trophy fixture. The game ended 1–1 after extra time, with Bradley scoring for Southampton, resulting in the sides sharing the title. Southampton's final 1947 pre-season friendly took place on 11 June, when they faced a team representing the British Army of the Rhine in Hanover, Germany as part of the commemoration of Liberation from Nazi Germany; the hosts won 4–1, with Don Roper scoring the consolation for the visitors.

Squad statistics

Most appearances

Top goalscorers

Transfers

Footnotes

References

Bibliography

Southampton F.C. seasons
Southampton